Nedžad Verlašević (8 October 1955 – 21 January 2001) was a Yugoslav and later Bosnian football manager and player.

Club career
He played a club record of 350 league matches for hometown club Sloboda Tuzla.

He also had a season with Željezničar.

Personal life

Death
Verlašević died of a heart attack in 2001, only 45 years of age.

Honours

Player
Yugoslavia Youth
UEFA European Under-21 Championship: 1978

Manager
Sloga Jugomagnat
Macedonian Cup: 1995–96

References

External links

naslsoccer.blogspot.com
NASL stats

1955 births
2001 deaths
People from Bratunac
Association football defenders
Yugoslav footballers
Yugoslavia under-21 international footballers
FK Sloboda Tuzla players
San Jose Earthquakes (1974–1988) players
FK Željezničar Sarajevo players
Yugoslav First League players
North American Soccer League (1968–1984) players
Yugoslav expatriate footballers
Expatriate soccer players in the United States
Yugoslav expatriate sportspeople in the United States
Bosnia and Herzegovina football managers
FK Sloga Jugomagnat managers
FK Sloboda Tuzla managers
FK Željezničar Sarajevo managers
ND Gorica managers
NK Jedinstvo Bihać managers
Bosnia and Herzegovina expatriate football managers
Expatriate football managers in North Macedonia
Bosnia and Herzegovina expatriate sportspeople in North Macedonia
Expatriate football managers in Slovenia
Bosnia and Herzegovina expatriate sportspeople in Slovenia